Don't Worry, He Won't Get Far on Foot is a 2018 American comedy-drama film directed by Gus Van Sant and based upon the memoir of the same name by John Callahan. The cast includes Joaquin Phoenix, Jonah Hill, Rooney Mara, and Jack Black, and follows a recently paralyzed alcoholic who finds a passion for drawing off-color newspaper cartoons.

The film had its world premiere at the Sundance Film Festival on January 19, 2018, and was released on July 13, 2018, by Amazon Studios.

Plot

Alcoholic cartoonist John Callahan meets Dexter at a party, and the two get in a car. Dexter's drunk driving results in a car accident, which leaves John quadriplegic. John falls in love with Swedish physical therapist Annu, who treats him at the hospital and later becomes his girlfriend. After he quits drinking with help from his Alcoholics Anonymous sponsor Donnie, John builds a new life, drawing off-color newspaper cartoons.

Cast

Production 
Originally, Robin Williams had optioned the book and invited Gus Van Sant to adapt it. On November 29, 2016, it was announced that actor Joaquin Phoenix was teaming with director Van Sant for the biographical film of cartoonist John Callahan, based on Callahan's autobiography Don't Worry, He Won't Get Far on Foot. Charles-Marie Anthonioz, Mourad Belkeddar, and Nicolas Lhermitte would produce the film for Iconoclast, and Steve Golin for Anonymous Content.

In December 2016, Rooney Mara and Jonah Hill joined the cast of the film. Hill considers his performance in the film to be the best of his career. In February 2017, Jack Black joined the cast of the film. In March 2017, Mark Webber and Angelique Rivera joined the cast of the film. Principal photography began on March 6, 2017 and concluded on April 6, 2017. The film was shot by Christopher Blauvelt.

Release

In March 2017, it was confirmed Amazon Studios would distribute the film. It had its world premiere at the Sundance Film Festival on January 19, 2018 and also screened at the Berlin International Film Festival on February 20, 2018. It was scheduled to be released on May 11, 2018, then was pushed back to July 13, 2018.

Reception
On review aggregator Rotten Tomatoes, the film has an approval rating of 76% based on 191 reviews, with an average of 6.6/10. The website's critical consensus reads, "Don't Worry, He Won't Get Far on Foot avoids inspirational biopic clichés thanks to sensitive work from writer-director Gus Van Sant and the admirable efforts of a well-chosen cast." On Metacritic, the film has a weighted average score of 67 out of 100, based on 39 critics, indicating "generally favorable reviews".

David Rooney of The Hollywood Reporter gave the film a positive review, writing: "This unwieldy but consistently enjoyable portrait of paraplegic local hero John Callahan is notable for its generosity of spirit and gentleness". Peter Debruge of Variety gave the film a positive review, calling it a "life-affirming sweet-and-sour concoction" and writing, "Some will find it entirely too sentimental, others a tad repetitive (Callahan tends to repeat the same stories), but it’s hard to argue with a movie that celebrates the kind of recovery he went through."

References

External links
 
 Official website
 

2010s biographical films
2018 comedy-drama films
Amazon Studios films
American comedy-drama films
American biographical films
Comedy-drama films based on actual events
Biographical films about artists
Films about comics
Films about alcoholism
Films about paraplegics or quadriplegics
Films based on autobiographies
Films directed by Gus Van Sant
Films scored by Danny Elfman
Films set in Portland, Oregon
Films with screenplays by Gus Van Sant
Cultural depictions of cartoonists
Films set in the 1970s
Films set in the 1980s
2010s English-language films
2010s American films